Gabriela Sabatini was the defending champion and won in the final 6–2, 5–7, 6–4 against Arantxa Sánchez.

Seeds
A champion seed is indicated in bold text while text in italics indicates the round in which that seed was eliminated. The top eight seeds received a bye to the second round.

  Gabriela Sabatini (champion)
  Manuela Maleeva (third round)
  Helen Kelesi (third round)
  Arantxa Sánchez (final)
  Hana Mandlíková (third round)
  Sandra Cecchini (quarterfinals)
  Judith Wiesner (quarterfinals)
  Raffaella Reggi (quarterfinals)
  Terry Phelps (third round)
  Bettina Fulco (semifinals)
  Nicole Provis (first round)
  Isabelle Demongeot (third round)
  Barbara Paulus (third round)
  Nathalie Tauziat (semifinals)
  Niege Dias (second round)
  Ann Grossman (first round)

Draw

Finals

Top half

Section 1

Section 2

Bottom half

Section 3

Section 4

References
 1989 Italian Open Draw

Women's Singles